Typhlomangelia cariosa is a species of sea snail, a marine gastropod mollusk in the family Borsoniidae.

Description

Distribution
This marine species is found off Kerguelen Islands

References

 Watson 1886. Report on the Scaphopoda and Gasteropoda collected by H.M.S. Challenger during the years 1873–76. Reports of the Scientific Results of the voyage of H.M.S. Challenger, Zoology, 42: 1–756.
 Powell A.W.B. (1960) Antarctic and Subantarctic Mollusca; Records of the Auckland Institute and Museum Vol. 5, No. 3/4

cariosa
Gastropods described in 1886